Rosalie Emslie (26 January 1891 – 1977) was a British artist known for her landscape and portrait paintings.

Biography
Emslie was born in London into an artistic family. Her grandfather was the engraver John Emslie while her father was the artist Alfred Edward Emslie and her mother was the noted miniature painter  Rosalie M. Emslie. Although born in London, the family home being in Poland Street in Westminster, after 1901 she lived for a time in Otford in Kent with her mother and aunt. The younger Rosalie Emslie was privately educated before attending the Royal Academy Schools between 1913 and 1918. She went on to study in Spain, Italy and France.

Emslie exhibited on a regular basis at the Royal Academy and with the New English Art Club and the Society of Women Artists. She was elected a member of the Royal Society of British Artists in 1922. Emslie also exhibited in America and Italy. For a time she lived in Petersfield in Hampshire and then in Reigate with the artist Florence May Asher.

References

External links

1891 births
1977 deaths
20th-century English painters
20th-century English women artists
Alumni of the Royal Academy Schools
English women painters
Painters from London
People from Otford